Rhosmeirch is a small village in Anglesey, Wales. It is in the community of Llangefni.

External links 
photos of Rhosmeirch and surrounding area on geograph

Villages in Anglesey
Llangefni